Veep is a comedy television series.

Veep may also refer to:
 Vice president
 Veep Records, a defunct American music label (subsidiary of United Artists Records)
 Saint Veep, a sixth-century English saint

See also
 St Veep, a village in Cornwall, England